Annius Rufus succeeded Marcus Ambivulus as the 3rd Prefect of Judea in 12.

History
His tenure was apparently without incident since the only event that Josephus reports as occurring while he was in office is the death of Augustus in Rome in 14. He was succeeded by Valerius Gratus in 15.

Sources
 Josephus: Antiquities of the Jews, Book 18, Ch. 2.

See also
 Gens Annia

External links
 Annius Rufus entry in historical sourcebook by Mahlon H. Smith.

Roman governors of Judaea
1st-century Romans
1st-century Roman governors of Judaea
Annii